Kavanagh is a hamlet in Alberta, Canada within Leduc County.

The hamlet was settled by workers of the Kavanagh block of the Canadian National Railway and was named for Charles Edmund Kavanagh, railway superintendent. The grain elevators have since closed and been relocated.

Kavanagh was declared a hamlet on January 5, 1980 by Marvin E. Moore, Minister of Municipal Affairs.

Demographics 

See also 
List of communities in Alberta
List of hamlets in Alberta

References 

Designated places in Alberta
Hamlets in Alberta
Leduc County